Folinia is a genus of minute sea snails, marine gastropod mollusks or micromollusks in the family Zebinidae.

Species
Species within the genus Folinia include:
 Folinia ericana (Hertlein & Strong, 1951)
 Folinia mottezi (Bavay, 1917)
 Folinia signae (Bartsch, 1915)
Species brought into synonymy
 Folinia bermudezi (Aguayo & Rehder, 1936): synonym of Mirarissoina bermudezi (Aguayo & Rehder, 1936)
 Folinia histia (Bartsch, 1915): synonym of Mirarissoina histia (Bartsch, 1915)

References

 Crosse, H., 1868. Les méléagrinicoles. Espèces nouvelles, par L. de Folin (1). [Review]. Journal de Conchyliologie 16: 217-219

External links
 Ponder W. F. (1985) A review of the genera of the Rissoidae (Mollusca: Mesogastropoda: Rissoacea). Records of the Australian Museum supplement 4: 1-221

Zebinidae